St. Paul's Church is a Romanesque church near Nexø on the Danish island of Bornholm. Unlike similar churches on the island, it has no tower.

History and architecture 

Located on a hilltop in south-eastern Bornholm, St. Paul's, the youngest of the island's Romanesque churches, consists of an apse, chancel and nave. Built c. 1248, it is distinctive in that it does not have an integrated tower. It does, however, have a separate, well-designed bell tower with a half-timbered belfry which originally served as the gateway to the churchyard. In 1871, the nave was lengthened some 4 metres towards the west. A fleur-de-lys can be seen above the door of the south porch.

Interior 

The church has several well-preserved frescoes from c. 1560, some depicting scenes from the Easter story (on the north wall of the nave), others with animals at play. The Renaissance pulpit from c. 1600 is similar to the one in Nexø Church which also has arched panels. The apse has three Romanesque windows with a cross-shaped finish. The Late Romanesque limestone font is from Gotland. The organ from 1973 was built by Poul-Gerhard Andersen.

Gallery

See also 
 List of churches on Bornholm

References 

Churches in Bornholm
Romanesque architecture in Denmark
Church frescos in Denmark
Lutheran churches converted from Roman Catholicism